Palayad is a census town in Thalassery Taluk in the Indian state of Kerala.

Demographics
 India census, Palayad had a population of 16,462. Males constitute 49% of the population and females 51%. Palayad has an average literacy rate of 83%, higher than the national average of 59.5%: male literacy is 87%, and female literacy is 79%. In Palayad, 10% of the population is under 6 years of age.

Educational institutions

As part of the National Education Policy (1986), District Institute for Education and Training (DIETs) were established in selected districts all over India in 1986, along with Kannur DIET here. Govt. Brennen College, founded in 1851, is one of the oldest educational institutions in the region. There is also a Center of Kannur University here which provides Post Graduate courses.

Important Educational Institutions in and around Palayad are

 District Institute for Education and Training, Kannur
 Government Higher Secondary School
 Brennen College, Thalassery
 Kannur University, Palayad Campus, Thalassery
 Kendriya Vidyalaya

University Campus
University of Calicut maintained its English and Anthropology departments at Palayad for a long time.  When the University of Calicut was bifurcated to form a new Kannur University, Palayad came under the jurisdidiction of Kannur University.

See Also Educational Institutions in Thalassery

Transportation
The national highway passes through Dharmadam town. Mangalore, Goa and Mumbai can be accessed on the northern side and Cochin and Thiruvananthapuram can be accessed on the southern side. The nearest railway stations are Dharmadam and Thalassery on Mangalore-Palakkad line. 
Trains are available to almost all parts of India subject to advance booking over the internet.  There are airports at Kannur, Mangalore and Calicut. All of them are international airports but direct flights are available only to Middle Eastern countries.

References

Villages near Thalassery